Dr. C Palanivelu is well known gastrosurgeon in the state of Tamil Nadu, India. He was born to poor farm workers from the village Avarankattupudur in Paramathi Velur,  Namakkal

Innovations
 He invented new technique for cancer esophagus in esophagectomy. This procedure named after him and called "Palanivelu’s technique of esophagectomy".
 Laparoscopic Whipple operation for cancer Pancreas first to perform and completed first time in the world. 
 Choledochalcyst laparoscopic excision & Hepatojejunostomy
 Hydatid cyst excision ( palanivelu’s hydatid trocar system )
 Single incision colorectal cancer resection ( SAGES award winning operation)
 Gastrectomy for cancer stomach (Key note address Japanese society 2006)

Awards
He has been awarded "Life Time achievement" for his contribution in field of cancer. He also the recipient of the highest honour of the Royal College of Surgeons of Edinburgh, United Kingdom in appreciation of his scientific contribution in the field of minimal access surgery at global level.

Dr.B.C.Roy National Award : Government of India recognised and bestowed upon him Dr BC Roy National Award under the category of development of specialty medicine namely laparoscopic surgery in 2006 & Eminent Medical Person category in 2016.

International Olympic Silver medal winner : First Indian to win International Olympic Silver Medal for surgery which was held at Phoenix US In 2009. Sages and JSES jointly organised international Olympic surgery in MAS which was held at Phoenix Texas first ever in history of surgery.

Best paper award winner : 6 th World congress of Endoscopic surgeons , Rome , Italy 1998. Best paper award for the paper "Laparoscopic subtotal cholecystectomy.

First Indian to win Best Video award in EAES : 16th European Best video award and first prize 2500 Euros in 2007. First Indian and only Indian to win award till now.

Best Technique Award International Society for Diseases of Esophagus : During 10th world congress of ISDE International Society for Diseases of Esophagus, Kagoshima Japan 2010.

Honorary Fellowship - Honorio causa : Recipient of Honorary Fellowship of medicine " Honorary Causa" 2014 by the San American university, Lima PERU, the oldest university in the world formed in the year 1551.

Gold Medal in honor : Kazhaskhan National Association of Medicine "Gold Medal" in honor significant contribution for development of surgery during

Pan Russian countries Medical conference in 2013 at Astana.

Top Two Great Surgeons : First Indian honoured by European Association of Endoscopic Surgeons for Significant contribution to development of Laparoscopic Surgery during World Congress of Endoscopic Surgery at Paris June 2014. 1. Prof Palanivelu India 2. Prof John Hunter US

Charity 
Not forgotten his background, he goes to villages regularly to organise free camps and select patients for free operations through GEM Medical Foundation a charitable organisation.

GEM Digestive Diseases Foundation 
 To serve the needy and economically backward common public.
 Conduction of 65 in house periodic free medical camps.
 Bearing of all the medical expenses.
 Provision of high tech medical facilities and treatment at free / affordable cost.
 Served 47,526 of patients till now 3,485 of free laparoscopic surgeries.
 Financial assistance for poor students to persuade education.

GEM Mobile Clinic - "To reach the unreachable" 
 Conduction of free medical camps in rural areas.
 Early detection of diseases.
 Awareness creation in public health issues.
 Incorporates eminent expert team of doctors.
 Equipped with modern scientific tools.
 Facilitated with laboratory, ultrasonology and endoscopy.
 Free checkup, free treatment.

Establishment of first Preventive gastroenterology Clinic 
 To create awareness among the public in prevention.
 For early detection.
 For health education.
 Cancer screening.
 Obesity clinic.

Health Education 
 To make everyone realize "Prevention is better than cure"
 Health care awareness creation via lectures, meetings and media journals, dailies, magazines and television.
 A serial of lectures in Doordarshan - "Vayirae Nalama", 2005
 Major issues for discussion: Obesity and GI Malignancies aiming Prevention, early detection, cure.
 Public health education.
 Periodic Hepatitis-B Awareness and free vaccination.
 programmes every year one month in August.

GEM Nursing Education 
 For brilliant, poor female students food, accommodation, college fees and transport are all made free for studying B.Sc Nursing.

References 

Indian gastroenterologists
Year of birth missing (living people)
Living people
Medical doctors from Tamil Nadu